George Donald "Rosy" Starn (August 17, 1902 – August 1977) was an American football, basketball, and baseball player and coach and college athletics administrator. He served as the head football coach at Kent State University from 1935 to 1942, compiling a record of 34–28–3. Starn coached at Ashland High School in Ashland, Ohio for eight years before he was hired at Kent State.

Head coaching record

College football

References

External links
 

1902 births
1977 deaths
American men's basketball players
Baseball pitchers
Cambridge Canners players
Jersey City Skeeters players
Kent State Golden Flashes athletic directors
Kent State Golden Flashes baseball coaches
Kent State Golden Flashes football coaches
Kent State Golden Flashes men's basketball coaches
Springfield Ponies players
Wooster Fighting Scots baseball players
Wooster Fighting Scots football players
Wooster Fighting Scots men's basketball players
High school football coaches in Ohio
People from Orrville, Ohio
Coaches of American football from Ohio
Players of American football from Ohio
Basketball coaches from Ohio
Basketball players from Ohio
Baseball coaches from Ohio
Baseball players from Ohio